One Must Fall (OMF) is a fighting game series for the IBM PC compatible, programmed by Diversions Entertainment.

One Must Fall

The original One Must Fall is a game demo created in the wake of the success of Street Fighter II. It features two human fighters who greatly resemble the Karate Champ fighters who fight in a single arena. Players can kick, punch, throw, create fireballs, teleport, and do a jumpkick. The game was completely retooled for a commercial release, as the original concept was considered too repetitive. This prototype was featured in several collections of shareware and freeware games.

One Must Fall: 2097

Released in 1994 by Epic MegaGames, One Must Fall: 2097 replaced the human fighters with robots. In-game competitors were connected to a machine which allowed them direct control as well as sensation of their robot counterparts. Eleven robots and ten customizable pilots were available for play, along with five arenas and four tournaments. The pilots vary in strength, speed and endurance, thus the many robot/pilot combinations allow for larger replay value.

One Must Fall: Battlegrounds

Developed by Diversions Entertainment and co-published in December 2003 by Diversions Publishing and Trisynergy Inc. following nearly seven years of development, One Must Fall: Battlegrounds brought the One Must Fall series into a second installment released in an age where the gaming world expected graphics and gameplay in three dimensions with internet gameplay an integral portion of the offering.

References

External links
 omf.com, last archived official site (2007, down since April 2010, discussion about).
 Official OMF: 2097 download, full version since it has been released as freeware (archived version)
 OMF: 2097 FAQ, Definitive FAQ by Robyrt Marney
 OpenOMF, a fan-made remake of the game using C and SDL
 animehunter.github.com/omfbrowser - play OMF 2097 inside a browser

Video game franchises